Linda E. Carlson (born 10 August 1969) is a Canadian clinical psychologist. She is a professor at the University of Calgary, where she holds the Enbridge Research Chair in Psychosocial Oncology.

Education and career 
Carlson earned an undergraduate degree in psychology from the University of Calgary in 1991, and a Ph.D. in clinical psychology from McGill University in 1998.

Carlson is currently a professor in the Division of Psychosocial Oncology in the Department of Oncology, Cumming School of Medicine, and an Adjunct Professor in the Department of Psychology at the University of Calgary. She holds the Enbridge Research Chair in Psychosocial Oncology.

Carlson conducts research on psychosocial topics within oncology, including issues of cancer-related distress; integrative oncology interventions (such as mindfulness); and survivorship. She has published over 240 research papers and books.

Selected works 

 
 
 
 Shapiro, S. L., & Carlson, L. E. (2009). The art and science of mindfulness: Integrating mindfulness into psychology and the helping professions. Washington, DC: American Psychological Association.

References

External links 

Living people
1969 births
Canadian psychologists
Canadian women psychologists
University of Calgary alumni
McGill University Faculty of Science alumni
Academic staff of the University of Calgary